Exo Planet #5 – Exploration (stylized as EXO PLANET #5 – EXplOration) is the fifth concert tour headlined by South Korean-Chinese boy band Exo. The tour was officially announced on May 30, 2019, and began on July 19, 2019, in South Korea. The tour concluded on December 31, 2019, comprising 31 shows in 9 countries.

Concerts

Seoul
 The announcement of the tour was made officially by SM Entertainment in May 2019, starting with six days in Olympic Gymnastics Arena on July 19–21 and 26–28, 2019.

Hong Kong 

 The first concert outside of Korea was on August 10, 2019, at Asia World Expo Arena in Hong Kong.
 The second concert is on August 11th, 2019, at Asia World Expo Arena in Hong Kong.

Manila
 The first day of the concert on August 23, was added after the second day of the concert.

Set list

Tour dates

Television broadcasts

References

2019 concert tours
Exo concert tours
K-pop concerts